Oumar Ballo (born 13 July 2002) is a Malian college basketball player for the Arizona Wildcats of the Pac-12 Conference. He previously played for the Gonzaga Bulldogs.

Early life and career
Ballo grew up in Koulikoro, Mali playing football as a goalkeeper but shifted his focus to basketball due to his exceptional height. His mother and brother, who had moved to France at age 15 to play the latter sport, encouraged him to switch to basketball. As a child, Ballo idolized National Basketball Association (NBA) player Shaquille O'Neal.

High school career
When he was 11 years old, Ballo began training with coach Mohamed Diarra in his hometown, eventually earning an invitation from Canterbury Academy, a British private school in Las Palmas, Spain. He enrolled as a full-time student, despite not knowing Spanish or English, and started practicing basketball three times per day. In May 2017, Ballo was named most valuable player (MVP) of the Spain Under-16 Championship after helping Canterbury finish in third place, behind bigger clubs like Barcelona and Real Madrid, and leading the tournament in rebounds. In 2018, he averaged 15.1 points, 10.8 rebounds, and 2.3 blocks per game at the Spanish Junior Championship, earning MVP honors.

In October 2018, Ballo moved to NBA Academy Latin America, a training center in Mexico City sponsored by the NBA, CONADE, and Mexican Basketball Federation. He missed a large portion of the 2018–19 season with an ankle injury. In February 2019, Ballo played at the Basketball Without Borders camp at 2019 NBA All-Star Weekend in Charlotte, North Carolina, where he was one of the youngest participants.

Recruiting
In 2019, Ballo reclassified from the 2020 recruiting class to the 2019 class and was subsequently rated a four-star recruit by 247Sports and a five-star recruit by Rivals. On 23 February 2019, he verbally committed to Gonzaga over offers from Arizona and Baylor, among others.

College career
On 28 October 2019, Ballo was ruled an academic redshirt for the 2019–20 season by the National Collegiate Athletic Association. As a freshman, he averaged 2.5 points and 1.5 rebounds per game, earning West Coast Conference (WCC) All-Freshman Team honors. After the season, Ballo transferred to Arizona to play for head coach Tommy Lloyd, who had recruited him to Gonzaga.

National team career
Ballo played for Mali at the 2017 FIBA Under-16 African Championship in Vacoas-Phoenix, Mauritius. He averaged 14.4 points and 12.8 rebounds per game, winning the gold medal while making the tournament All-Star Five. Playing for Mali at the 2018 FIBA Under-17 World Cup in Argentina, Ballo averaged 20.6 points and a tournament-high 16.9 rebounds per game and was named to the All-Star Five. On 7 July 2018, he recorded 32 points and a tournament-record 32 rebounds in a 110–108 triple overtime loss to the Dominican Republic. Ballo won a gold medal with Mali at the 2018 FIBA Under-18 African Championship in Bamako, Mali. He averaged 8.5 points and six rebounds per game.

Ballo competed at the 2019 FIBA Under-19 World Cup in Heraklion, Greece, missing the first two games due to visa issues. In five games, he averaged 17.6 points, 11.8 rebounds, and 3.8 blocks per game, leading Mali to a silver medal, the best performance by an African team at a global basketball tournament. Ballo was named to the All-Star Five with teammate Siriman Kanouté.

Career statistics

College

|-
| style="text-align:left;"| 2019–20
| style="text-align:left;"| Gonzaga
| style="text-align:center;" colspan="11"|  Redshirt
|-
| style="text-align:left;"| 2020–21
| style="text-align:left;"| Gonzaga
| 24 || 0 || 6.3 || .629 || – || .552 || 1.5 || .1 || .2 || .3 || 2.5
|-
| style="text-align:left;"| 2021–22
| style="text-align:left;"| Arizona
| 37 || 0 || 15.2 || .622 || – || .701 || 4.4 || .6 || .4 || 1.2 || 6.8
|- class="sortbottom"
| style="text-align:center;" colspan="2"| Career
| 61 || 0 || 11.7 || .623 || – || .667 || 3.3 || .4 || .3 || .8 || 5.1

Personal life
Ballo's mother and father stand  and  respectively. His older brother, Drissa, who stands  and weighs 118 kg (260 lbs), plays professional basketball in France.

References

External links
Arizona Wildcats bio
Gonzaga Bulldogs bio

2002 births
Living people
21st-century Malian people
Arizona Wildcats men's basketball players
Centers (basketball)
Gonzaga Bulldogs men's basketball players
Malian expatriate basketball people in Spain
Malian expatriate basketball people in the United States
Malian men's basketball players
People from Koulikoro Region